Space Science Reviews is a peer reviewed, scientific journal of space science. It was established in 1962, by Kees de Jager and is published now by Springer Nature B.V. The journal is currently edited by Hans Bloemen. Its purpose is to provide a comprehensive synthesis of the various branches of space research. The emphasis is on scientific results and instruments in the fields of astrophysics, physics of planetary systems, solar physics, and physics of magnetospheres & interplanetary matter. Space Science Reviews publishes invited articles and topical volumes.

References

External links
Space Science Reviews website

Publications established in 1962
Springer Science+Business Media academic journals
English-language journals
Space science journals